Hamilton dos Santos Júnior (born 2 April 1977), commonly known as Júnior Bahia, is a retired Brazilian footballer who played as a forward.

International career
Júnior played five games at the 1997 FIFA World Youth Championship, scoring in his country's 10-0 win over Belgium.

Career statistics

Club

Notes

References

1977 births
Living people
Brazilian footballers
Brazilian expatriate footballers
Association football forwards
Esporte Clube Bahia players
Centro Sportivo Alagoano players
C.S. Marítimo players
F.C. Penafiel players
F.C. Paços de Ferreira players
Treze Futebol Clube players
S.S.D. Città di Brindisi players
Camaçari Futebol Clube players
Nacional Fast Clube players
Barras Futebol Club players
Primeira Liga players
Liga Portugal 2 players
Segunda Divisão players
Serie D players
Brazilian expatriate sportspeople in Portugal
Expatriate footballers in Portugal
Brazilian expatriate sportspeople in Italy
Expatriate footballers in Italy